Andrew Shovlin is a British Formula One engineer. He is currently the trackside engineering director at the Mercedes AMG Petronas Motorsport Formula One team.

Career
Shovlin graduated from Leeds University in 1998, after completing a BEng in Mechanical Engineering, followed by a PhD in Vehicle Dynamics and Control. 
Shovlin started his career with BAR in 1999. In 2004-2009 Shovlin worked for BAR, and later Honda and Brawn GP as race engineer to Jenson Button. In 2010, he was appointed as race engineer for Michael Schumacher at Mercedes GP. He was promoted to the position of track engineering director in 2011, a position he has retained to this day. Shovlin's current role consists of extracting the maximum performance out of both cars on any given weekend. He works very closely with the engineering teams on both sides of the Mercedes garage and the performance groups back in Brackley to ensure that both cars benefit from the best available information at a race weekend.

References

1973 births
Living people
21st-century British engineers
Formula One engineers
Mercedes-Benz in Formula One
Brawn GP